Walter Adams (born 15 March 1945 in Wasseralfingen) is a retired West German middle distance runner who specialized in the 800 metres.

He finished fourth at the 1968 Olympic Games, and won a gold medal in 3 x 1000 metres relay at the 1969 European Indoor Games together with teammates Peter Adam and Harald Norpoth. He also competed at the 1966 European Championships and the Olympic Games without reaching the final.

His personal best time was 1.44.9 minutes, achieved in July 1970 in Stuttgart. This was the European record once. He also helped setting two world records in 4 x 800 metres and 4 x 880 yards relay, in 1966 and 1968.

He competed for the sports club SV Salamander Kornwestheim during his active career. He became West German champion in 1968, 1969 and 1972.

References 

1945 births
Living people
Athletes (track and field) at the 1968 Summer Olympics
Athletes (track and field) at the 1972 Summer Olympics
Olympic athletes of West Germany
West German male middle-distance runners
People from Aalen
Sportspeople from Stuttgart (region)
SV Salamander Kornwestheim athletes